Komo-Margarima District is a district of the Hela Province of Papua New Guinea.  Its capital is Margarima.  The population was 132,746 at the 2011 census.

References

Districts of Papua New Guinea
Hela Province